İzmir Atatürk Stadium is a multi-purpose stadium in İzmir, Turkey. It was named after the Turkish statesman Mustafa Kemal Atatürk. It is currently used mostly for football matches and occasionally for track and field events. The stadium holds 51,295 people. It was opened in 1971, and most recently refurbished in 2005. İzmir football teams Altay S.K. and Karşıyaka S.K. occasionally use the stadium for high attendance matches. İzmir Atatürk Stadium's running track has ten lanes.

The stadium hosted the 1971 Mediterranean Games, the Islamic Games in 1980 and the 2005 Summer Universiade. The stadium also hosted the Fortis Turkey Cup Final in 2009 in which Beşiktaş beat Fenerbahçe 4-2 to win the cup for the 8th time.

Singer Michael Jackson planned to perform at the stadium on October 7, 1992 on his Dangerous World Tour, but this show was cancelled due to illness.

Records 

A.  The official attendance was reported as 67,696, but the actual figure is believed to be anywhere between 80,000 and 85,000.

References

External links

Venue information
 Google map of İzmir Atatürk Stadium

Sports venues completed in 1971
Football venues in Turkey
Ataturk Stadium
Multi-purpose stadiums in Turkey
Konak District
1971 establishments in Turkey
Things named after Mustafa Kemal Atatürk